The canton of Luzech is an administrative division of the Lot department, southern France. Its borders were modified at the French canton reorganisation which came into effect in March 2015. Its seat is in Luzech.

It consists of the following communes:
 
Albas
Anglars-Juillac
Barguelonne-en-Quercy
Bélaye
Caillac
Cambayrac
Carnac-Rouffiac
Castelfranc
Douelle
Lendou-en-Quercy
Luzech
Montcuq-en-Quercy-Blanc
Montlauzun
Parnac
Saint-Vincent-Rive-d'Olt
Sauzet
Villesèque

References

Cantons of Lot (department)